Pseuderosia desmierdechenoni is a species of moth of the family Drepanidae. It is endemic to Sundaland.

The wingspan is 15–17 mm.

The larvae have been reared on Elaeis species.

References

Drepaninae
Moths described in 1998